Camp Cody, located on the northwest side of Deming, New Mexico, was a World War I Army camp from 1916 to 1919.

History

During World War I, Camp Cody, commanded by Augustus P. Blocksom, was an army training camp for the National Guard units from North and South Dakota, Nebraska, Minnesota, and Iowa. Soldiers received basic training there before leaving for the war in France. The different National Guard units together formed the 34th Infantry Division and were nicknamed the "Sandstorm Division," a name based on the camp's desert climate. Camp Cody was also built because of the threat of Mexican intervention in the first World War.

Construction

The camp was constructed during the summer of 1917 by the government. Unable to accommodate the 30,000 troops that served at the camp it was necessary to build 120 mess houses and 1,200 bathhouses. Each regiment had its own office building and it took 11 large warehouses to store all the supplies needed for the Division. A large hospital was needed and stayed in use long after the war ended.
June 14, 1918, Hughes Co. (Oklahoma) Men Called To the Colors.  Call No. 607 for 113 recruits to entrain from Hughes county for Camp Cody, Deming, New Mexico, between the 24th and 29 June.  The following are the names and addresses of those called.  Olen Ashby, Holdenville, E. F. McKinney, Dustin, Raymond Sieminshie, Stuart, C. E. Dewitt, Holdonville, Clarence Spruell, Holdenville, Earl Crane, Stuart, Daniel A. Johnson, Holdenville, William N. Stanfill, Wetumka, Albert Annis, Wetumka, Charles W. Stanfill, Wetumka, Rufus Garland, Wetumka, Leftric Perry, Holdenville, Tom Sanders, Holderville, R. B. White, Dustin.

World War One

During the US-Mexican Border War the camp was named "Camp Brooks". Then with the beginning of the First World War it was renamed "Camp Deming". The camp was renamed again shortly after the death of the famous buffalo hunter and showman, William F. Cody (1846–1917), better known as "Buffalo Bill Cody." The camp was open from July 16, 1916, until the early months of 1919.

During the 34th Division's mobilization in the summer of 1918, a controversy arose when Frederick Emil Resche, commander of the 68th Infantry Brigade, was accused of anti-American sentiments.  Resche, a native of Germany who was a naturalized U.S. citizen and longtime resident of Duluth, Minnesota, had proactively attempted to prevent accusations of disloyalty by taking no actions that could be considered anti-American, including forgoing a visit to his aged, ailing father in Germany. An investigation uncovered no wrongdoing, but Resche was still relieved of command for supposed inefficiency. He then retired from the military and returned to Duluth. The members of his brigade demonstrated their support for Resche by cheering him as he left Camp Cody.

References

External links
Training Camps & Schools - Camp Cody
143 Yound Men leave for Camp Cody
Alva Darst at Camp Cody Deming, New Mexico, 1918
Asked Agnes to marry him and live at Camp Cody
Officers and Enlisted Men of-Auxiliary Remount Dept No.326-Camp Cody
Camp Cody - Deming, New Mexico, U.S. Army - WW1

Closed installations of the United States Army
Military installations in New Mexico
History of New Mexico
History of Luna County, New Mexico
1916 establishments in New Mexico
1919 disestablishments in New Mexico